The women's keirin competition at the 2021 UEC European Track Championships was held on 9 October 2021.

Results

First round
The first two riders in each heat qualified to the second round, all other riders advanced to the first round repechages.

Heat 1

Heat 2

Heat 3

First round repechage
The first three riders in each heat qualify to the second round.

Heat 1

Heat 2

Second round
The first three riders in each heat qualified to final 1–6, all other riders advanced to final 7–12.

Heat 1

Heat 2

Finals
Small final

Final

References

Women's keirin
European Track Championships – Women's keirin